Delaney Creek is a stream in Washington County, in the U.S. state of Indiana.

Delaney Creek was named for a Native American (Indian) named Delaney who settled there.

See also
List of rivers of Indiana

References

Rivers of Washington County, Indiana
Rivers of Indiana